Crazy Enough may refer to:

 Crazy Enough (Storm Large album), 2009
 Crazy Enough (Bobby Wills album), 2014
 "Crazy Enough" (song), a 2018 song by Joe Bermudez
 "Crazy Enough", a song by Julie Bergan